Interstate 310 is the designation for several highways in the United States, which are related to Interstate 10:

Interstate 310 (Louisiana), connecting I-10 near Louis Armstrong International Airport with U.S. Route 90 near Boutte
Interstate 310 (Mississippi), proposed, connecting I-10 with U.S. Route 90 in Gulfport
The Vieux Carré Riverfront Expressway, a canceled freeway in New Orleans planned to be signed as Interstate 310

10-3
3